
Gmina Stegna is a rural gmina (administrative district) in Nowy Dwór Gdański County, Pomeranian Voivodeship, in northern Poland.

Villages
Gmina Stegna contains the villages and settlements of Broniewo, Bronowo, Chełmek, Chorążówka, Cysewo, Drewnica, Dworek, Głobica, Izbiska, Jantar, Junoszyno, Kępa Rybińska, Mikoszewo, Niedźwiedzica, Niedźwiedziówka, Nowotna, Popowo, Przemysław, Rybina, Rybinka, Stawidła, Stegienka, Stegna, Stobiec, Świerznica, Szkarpawa, Tujsk, Wiśniówka, Wybicko, Zadwórze, Żuławki and Żuławki Książęce.

Neighbouring gminas
Gmina Stegna is bordered by the city of Gdańsk and by the gminas of Cedry Wielkie, Nowy Dwór Gdański, Ostaszewo and Sztutowo.

References
Polish official population figures 2006

Stegna
Nowy Dwór Gdański County